For Lovers Only  is the debut album by the American musician Marion Meadows, released in 1990. It peaked in the top 10 on Billboard'''s Jazz Albums chart. Sharon Bryant sang on "I Found a New Love".

Critical reception

The Calgary Herald wrote that Meadows "has a decent sense of melody and mixes in a new-age edge to the gentle pop-funk numbers." The Ottawa Citizen deemed the album "electronic schmaltz of little interest." The Dallas Morning News'' noted that it "may be the quintessential contemporary jazz piece because it encompasses a little bit of everything—jazz, funk, dance."

Track listing
"I Found a New Love" - 5:22  	
"Forbidden Love" -  5:45 
"Sleepless Nights" - 5:18 	
"For Lovers Only"  -3:30 	
"The Real Thing" - 5:08 	
"Personal Touch"  -4:48 	
"Paradise"  -5:23 	
"Wonderland" -3:35 	
"Dear World" -4:08 	
"Just Before Dawn" 	-2:21

References

Marion Meadows albums
1990 albums
Novus Records albums